Izabela Elżbieta Czartoryska can refer to two Polish noble ladies of that surname:

 Princess Izabela Elżbieta Czartoryska (née Countess Morsztyn) (1671–1756) 
 Princess Izabella Elżbieta Czartoryska (1832–1899)